Saint-Martin-le-Vinoux is a commune in the Isère department in southeastern France, named after Saint Martin and the region's vineyards. It is part of the Grenoble urban unit (agglomeration). It is located north of the Isère, with an area of 1,006 hectares and altitudes from 205 to 1299 meters.

Population

Twin towns
Saint-Martin-le-Vinoux is twinned with:

  Brotterode, Germany, since 1993
  Moribabougou, Mali, since 1998
  Bălcești, Romania, since 1998

See also
 Casamaures
 Communes of the Isère department

References

Communes of Isère
Isère communes articles needing translation from French Wikipedia